Mohammad Abdus Sattar (1925 – 23 April 2011) was an Indian footballer. He was also known as Madar Abdus Sattar.

Career

Club career
Abdus Sattar started his career with the Bangalore Muslim Club, before joining the Mohammedan Sporting Club in 1949. He signed for Mohun Bagan in 1950, winning the 1955 Rovers Cup with them.

International career
After winning the 1951 Asian Games, Abdus Sattar went on to play one match at 1952 Summer Olympics.

Later life and death
After retiring from playing, Sattar coached Mohammedan Sporting Club and under his coaching, Mohammedan won the Calcutta Football League in 1981, which is also their last CFL title until date.

Sattar was the recipient of Mohun Bagan Ratna award in the year 2008.

Abdus Sattar died from pneumonia in Kolkata on 23 April 2011, at the age of 85. He had been suffering from dementia caused by Alzheimer's.

Honours

India
Asian Games Gold medal: 1951
 Colombo Cup: 1953, 1954, 1955

Mohun Bagan
Calcutta Football League: 1951, 1954, 1956
Durand Cup: 1953
IFA Shield: 1954, 1956
Rovers Cup: 1954

Bengal
Santosh Trophy: 1941, 1951, 1953, 1955

Howrah Union
Stafford Cup: 1964

Individual
Mohun Bagan Ratna: 2008

References

1925 births
2011 deaths
Indian footballers
India international footballers
Deaths from pneumonia in India
Footballers at the 1952 Summer Olympics
Olympic footballers of India
Asian Games medalists in football
Footballers at the 1951 Asian Games
Footballers from Bangalore
Medalists at the 1951 Asian Games
Asian Games gold medalists for India
Association football forwards
Mohammedan SC (Kolkata) players
Mohun Bagan AC players
Deaths from dementia in India
Deaths from Alzheimer's disease
Bangalore Muslims FC players
Calcutta Football League players